Red Rose White Rose is a 1994 Hong Kong drama film directed by Stanley Kwan, based on the Red Rose, White Rose novella by Eileen Chang. It was entered into the 45th Berlin International Film Festival.

Cast
Joan Chen as Wang Jiao-Rui
Winston Chao as Tung Zhen-Bao
Veronica Yip as Meng Yen Li
Zhao Chang as Tung Tu-Bao
Shi Ge as Rose
Shen Hua as Mr. Chang
Shen Tong Hua as Wang Ze Hong
Shen Fan Qi as Wei Ying
Yanyu Lin as Wu Ma
Sabine Bail as Purple Rose

Release
Red Rose White Rose was released in Hong Kong on 10 December 1994, and was screened at the Berlin International Film Festival in February 1995. In the Philippines, the film was released exclusively at SM Megamall beginning on 5 May 1995.

References

External links

1994 films
1994 drama films
Films directed by Stanley Kwan
Hong Kong drama films
Mandarin-language films
Films based on works by Eileen Chang
1990s Hong Kong films